Iván Leonidas Name Vásquez (born 18 June 1957) is a Senator of Colombia. A Green party politician he reached the Senate in 2010 after serving as Member of the Chamber of Representatives, Councillor for Bogotá, and Deputy to the Cundinamarca Departmental Assembly.

See also
 David Char Navas

References

1957 births
Living people
Ivan Leonidas
People from Barranquilla
Colombian people of Lebanese descent
Members of the Senate of Colombia
Members of the Chamber of Representatives of Colombia